The men's shot put event at the 1959 Pan American Games was held at the Soldier Field in Chicago on 1 September.

Results

References

Athletics at the 1959 Pan American Games
1959